Camo is a frazione of the province of Cuneo in north-west Italy.

Camo or CAMO may also refer to:

 CAMO, a swim club in Montreal, Quebec, Canada
 Camouflage, particularly military camouflage
 Continuing Airworthiness Management Organisation
 Camo, a chameleon in the 2006 Disney animated film The Wild
 "Camo", a single by BoA featured on the album One Shot, Two Shot